The 2009 TSC Stores Tankard was the 2009 edition of the Ontario provincial men's curling tournament. It was held on February 2-8 at the Woodstock District Community Complex in Woodstock, Ontario, Canada. The winning team represented Ontario at the 2009 Tim Hortons Brier in Calgary, Alberta (who ended the tournament second in the standings).

Teams

* Throws third stones

Standings

Results

Draw 1
February 2, 14:00

Draw 2
February 2, 19:45

Draw 3
February 3, 14:00

Draw 4
February 3, 19:00

Draw 5
February 4, 14:00

Draw 6
February 4, 19:00

Draw 7
February 5, 14:00

Draw 8
February 5, 19:00

Draw 9
February 6, 14:00

Playoffs

3 vs. 4
February 6, 1900

1 vs. 2
February 7, 1400

Semifinal
February 7, 1900

Final

Qualification
The tournament will consist of ten teams. Two from each of Southern Ontario's four regions and two from a provincial "last chance" qualification tournament. Teams from Northern Ontario will play in that region's provincial championship. Each of the four regions consist of four zones where two teams from which qualify for the regional tournaments.

Zones
Teams in bold advanced to regionals. 
Teams in italics elected to play in the challenge round (see below).

Zone 1
December 5-7, Navan Curling Club (Navan)

Teams:
Jeff Comer (Cornwall)
Dave Murphy (Glengarry) 
Ken Sullivan (Metcalfe)
Gilles Allaire (Ottawa)
Willie Jeffries (Ottawa)
Justin Chubaty (RCMP)
Charles Wert (Cornwall)
Brian Fleischhaker (Ottawa)
Matthew Paul (Ottawa)

Zone 2
December 20-23, Rideau Curling Club (Ottawa)

Teams:
Bill Blad (Rideau)
Brian Benning (Rideau)
Gary Rowe (Rideau)
Howard Rajala (Rideau)
Dan Baird (Rideau)
Blair Dawes (Rideau)
J. P. Lachance (Rideau)
Daryl Smith (Rideau)
Bryan Cochrane (Rideau)

Zone 3
December 20-22, Carleton Place Curling Club (Carleton Place)

Teams:
Doug Johnston (Arnprior)
Steve Lodge (Carleton Place)
Jeff McCrady (Carleton Place)
Art Miskew (City View)
Joshua Adams (Granite)
Damien Villard (Renfrew)
Chris Gardner (Arnprior)

Zone 4
December 19-21, Marmora & Area Curling Club (Marmora)

Teams:
Rob Dickson (Land O'Lakes)
Bryce Rowe (Land O'Lakes)
Dave Collyer (Quinte)
Alex Tosh (Royal Kingston)
Scott Kerr (Trenton)
Greg Balsdon (Loonie)
Jim Marshall (Land O'Lakes)
Ryan Ward (Quinte)
Paul Aitken (Trenton)

Zone 5
December 6-8, Bobcaygeon Curling Club (Bobcaygeon)

Teams:
Jake Speedie (Beaverton)
Dave Nigh (Lindsay)
Mark Bice (Peterborough)
John Collins (Peterborough)
Wayne Shea (Bobcaygeon)
Lee Cooper (Lakefield)

Zone 6
December 5-7, Annandale Country Club (Ajax)

Teams:
Blair Metrakos (Annandale)
Wes Johnson (Anandale)
Jeff Clark (Dalewood)
Brian Suddard (Oshawa)
Jim Thedorf (Oshawa)
Jon St. Denis (Oshawa)
Joe Frans (Oshawa)
Rob Steele (Port Perry)
Troy Winch (Sutton)
Bruce Jefferson (Uxbridge)
Greg Timbers (Uxbridge)
Gary Grant (Uxbridge)
Rob Lobel (Whitby)
Tim Morrison (Whitby)
John Bell (Unionville)
Scott McPherson (Unionville)

Zone 7
December 19-21, Richmond Hill Curling Club (Richmond Hill)

Teams:
Mike Harris (Donalda)
Dennis Elgie (East York)
Richard Van Dine (Leaside)
Norm McGlaughlin (Leaside)
Gregg Truscott (Scarboro)
Mike Maddin (Richmond Hill)
Ian Robertson (Thornhill)
Eric Doner (York)
Adrian Ritchie (East York)
Darryl Prebble (Scarboro)
Collin Mitchell (Scarboro)
Guy Racette (Scarboro)
Michael Keon (Richmond Hill)
Jim Dyas (Richmond Hill)
Dennis Moretto (Richmond Hill)
Jeff Flanagan (Toronto Cricket)

Zone 8
December 20-23, Dixie Curling Club (Mississauga)

Teams:
Kevin Flewwelling (Royal Canadian)
Scott McFadyen (High Park)
Bill Duck (St. George's) 
Wayne Middaugh (St. George's)
Jim Wilson (Oakville)
Paul Gareau (Oakville)

Zone 9
December 5-7, Markdale Golf & Curling Club (Markdale)

Teams:
Len McNichol (Chinguacousy)
Trevor Coburn (Markdale)
Alex Foster (North Halton)
Denis Cordick (North Halton)
Peter Corner (Brampton)
Steve Oldford (Milton)

Zone 10
December 19-21, Penetanguishene Curling Club (Penetanguishene)

Teams:
Rick Dafoe (Bradford)
Dale Matchett (Churchill)
Kevin Flemming (Elmvale)
G.W. King (Midland)
Bill Harrison (Penetanguishene)
Andrew Thompson (Stroud)
Bill Irwin (Barrie)
Glenn Howard (Coldwater)

Zone 11
December 5-7, Southampton Curling Club (Southampton)

Teams:
Dave Twining (Blue Water)
Al Hutchinson (Blue Water)
Pat Duggan (Meaford)
Curtis Cassidy (Port Elgin)
Terry Corbin (Port Elgin)
Cory Heggestad (Collingwood)
Al Corbeil (Collingwood)

Zone 12
December 5-7, Westmount Golf & Country Club (Kitchener) 

Teams:
Trevor Feil (Elora)
Gary Darroch (Fergus)
Scott Hodgson (Guelph)
Andrew Fairfull (Guelph)
Marc Joyce (Kitchener-Waterloo Granite)
Daryl Shane (Kitchener-Waterloo Granite)
Mike Anderson (Kitchener-Waterloo Granite)
Mark Kean (Kitchener-Waterloo Granite)
Peter Mellor (Kitchener-Waterloo Granite)
Greg Houston (Westmount)
Steve Szymanski (Guelph)
Ryan Sayer (Kitchener-Waterloo Granite)
Scott McLean (Westmount)

Zone 13
December 20-22, St. Catharines Curling Club (St. Catharines)

Teams:
Rick Thurston (Dundas Granite) 
Todd Maslin (Dundas Granite) 
Bill Mackay (Dundas Valley)
Matt Wilkinson (Glanford)
Drew Macklin (Glendale) 
Joe Lococo (Niagara Falls) 
Shane McCready (St. Catharines Golf) 
Daniel Frans (St. Catharines Golf) 
Mike Rowe (Burlington) 
Todd Brandwood (Glendale)
Pat Ferris (Grimsby)
Simon Ouellet (Grimsby)
Kris Blonski (Dundas Valley)
Garth Mitchell (St. Catharines)

Zone 14
December 5-7, Teeswater Curling Club (Teeswater)

Teams:
Michael Schumacher (Teeswater)
Mike Niesen (Walkerton)
Jake Higgs (Harriston) 
Steve Rathwell (Listowel)

Zone 15
December 19-21, Stratford Country Club (Stratford)

Teams:
Chad Allen (Brant)
Aaron Ward (Simcoe)
Ken Patterson (Tillsonburg)
Wayne Tuck, Jr. (Woodstock)
Gareth Parry (Brant)
Mark Futcher (St. Thomas)

Zone 16
December 5-7, Forest Curling & Social Club (Forest)

Teams:
Jerry Ferster (Chatham)
Phil Daniel (Chatham)
Shawn Hartle (Forest)
Kirk Ziola (Highland)
Ean MacDonald (London)
Bob Ingram (Ridgetown)
Al Beaucage (Sarnia)
Peter Steski (Sarnia)
Robert Stafford (Chatham)
Jeff Young (Heritage Heights)
Mike McLean (Ilderton)
Perry Smyth (Sydenham)

Regions
All on January 3-4 weekend

Region 1 (Zones 1-4)
Carleton Heights Curling Club, Ottawa

Region 2 (Zones 5-8)
St. George's Golf & Country Club, Etobicoke, Toronto

Region 3 (Zones 9-12)
Elmira & District Curling Club, Elmira

Region 4 (Zones 11-16)
Sarnia Golf & Curling Club, Sarnia

Challenge Round
Challenge rounds will be held January 16-19 at the Trenton Curling Club in Trenton and the Grey Granite Club in Owen Sound to determine the last two spots.
Both rounds are double knock-out

East Challenge Round

See also
2009 Ontario Scotties Tournament of Hearts

Tsc Stores Tankard, 2009
Sport in Woodstock, Ontario
Ontario Tankard
2009 in Ontario